Carl Nicolai Starcke (29 March 1858 in Copenhagen – 7 March 1926 in Copenhagen) was a Danish sociologist, politician, educator and philosopher.  He is buried at Holmens Cemetery. He was the father of Viggo Starcke, another writer and publisher of books such as Denmark in World History.

Life
Starcke graduated in 1883 with a thesis on Feuerbach. In 1916 he was against the resistance of Harald Høffding, a professor of philosophy at the University of Copenhagen. His first political party he joined was Venstre, a liberal party. In 1905 he co-founded the social-liberal party Venstre Det radicals. He was dissatisfied with the party and therefore started the establishment of Danmarks Retsforbund in 1919. From 1913 to 1916 he was chairman of the Henry George fora ingen.

Education
In 1899 Starcke founded Det Danske Selskabs Skole, the first free high school in Europe. It closed again in 1911, just 12 years after it was opened.

"The primitive family in its origin and development"

Family sociology
Starcke published a book named Die primitive Familie in ihrer Entstehung und Entwickelung in 1888. In it, he examined the social structures of different populations in Africa, Asia and Australia, and compared them with each other.

Starcke wrote about this book:

Comparative method
Starcke speculation turned against the construction of history and wants it by the application of the comparative method to replace. He is against a misunderstanding of this method:

According to Starcke, the comparative method can not be a common origin, but close to the same conditions.

Source criticism
He grappled with the quality of the source material, and explores the question of why authors come from the same sources to different results.

Starcke distinguished four categories of sources:
direct historical accounts of the development of a particular community during a certain period
travel stories
written down old laws and customs
ancient myths and legends and archaeological reports

He points to the problem circuits to interpolate to periods for which there are no sources.

Works
Most of these books were written in his native language Danish, but there are French and English translations available for several. Listed chronologically.

References

1858 births
1926 deaths
People from Copenhagen
Venstre (Denmark) politicians
Danish ethnologists
19th-century Danish philosophers
20th-century Danish philosophers
Danish sociologists
Danish educational theorists
Progressive education
Danish social liberals
Burials at Holmen Cemetery